Ilse Fürstenberg (12 December 1907, in Berlin – 16 December 1976, in Basel) was a German actress, working on stage, screen, television and as voice actress.

Selected filmography

 The Blue Angel (1930) - Raths Wirtschafterin / Maid
 M (1931) - (uncredited)
 The Captain from Köpenick (1931) - Marie Hoprecht
 Girls to Marry (1932)
 The Beautiful Adventure (1932)
 Unheimliche Geschichten (1932) - Frau in der Irrenanstalt
 The Testament of Cornelius Gulden (1932) - Frau Giesicke
 Hanneles Himmelfahrt (1934) - Wirtin
 The Csardas Princess (1934) - Mädi vom Chantant
 Jede Frau hat ein Geheimnis (1934)
 Glückspilze (1935) - Frau Roeder
 Hermine and the Seven Upright Men (1935) - Frau Kuser
 Forget Me Not (1935)
 Lady Windermere's Fan (1935) - Duchess of Barwick
 Artist Love (1935) - Frau Heller
 Frisians in Peril (1935) - Dörte Niegebüll
 Trouble Backstairs (1935) - Frau Irma Schulze
 Kater Lampe (1936) - Frau Ermscher
 Fräulein Veronika (1936) - Frau Kulicke
 Girls in White (1936) - Irina - seine Frau
 Die un-erhörte Frau (1936) - Helene, Stubenmädchen bei Brandt
 Der lustige Witwenball (1936)
 Susanne in the Bath (1936) - Reinemachefrau
 Nachtwache im Paradies (1937)
 Urlaub auf Ehrenwort (1938) - Frau Schmiedecke
 Wie einst im Mai (1938) - Mathilde, Haushälterin
 Skandal um den Hahn (1938) - Marie Maier - Mutter
 The Woman at the Crossroads (1938) - Frau Pawlowski
 Nanon (1938) - Die Magd
 In the Name of the People (1939) - Else Hartmann
 Salonwagen E 417 (1939) - Lautenschlägers spätere Frau
 Who's Kissing Madeleine? (1939) - Dorothy Simplon
 In letzter Minute (1939) - Minna
 D III 88 (1939) - Bäuerin
 Krach im Vorderhaus (1941) - Irma Schultze
 Ich klage an (1941)
 Annelie (1941) - Hausmädchen Ida
 Kameraden (1941) - Pauline
 The Great Love (1942) - Luftschutzwartin im Mietshaus
 Ein Zug fährt ab (1942) - Portierfrau Mielke
 Du gehörst zu mir (1943) - Frau Friebe
 Münchhausen (1943) - Rieke Kuchenreutter (uncredited)
 Altes Herz wird wieder jung (1943) - Portiersfrau von Brigitte (uncredited)
 Ein glücklicher Mensch (1943)
 I'll Carry You in My Arms (1943) - Dienstmädchen Lona
 Ein schöner Tag (1944) - Briefträgerin
 Große Freiheit Nr. 7 (1944) - Gisa's mother
 Kamerad Hedwig (1945) - Anna Kluge
 Somewhere in Berlin (1946)
 Intimitäten (1948) - Mathilde Dorndorffs
 Das Gesetz der Liebe (1949) - Frau Aktuarius Ketteler
 The Woman from Last Night (1950)
 The Sinful Border (1951)
 Prosecutor Corda (1953) - Grete
 Die Prinzessin und der Schweinehirt (1953)
 Father Is Being Stupid (1953) - Frau Kirchner, Wolfgangs Mutter
 The Golden Plague (1954) - Mrs. Försterling
 Canaris (1954) - Anna Lüdtke
 The Captain from Köpenick (1956) - Marie Hoprecht, Voigts Schwester
 Precocious Youth (1957) - Frau Messmann
 Schwarzwälder Kirsch (1958)
 Romarei, das Mädchen mit den grünen Augen (1958)
 The Scarlet Baroness (1959)
 Aus dem Tagebuch eines Frauenarztes (1959) - Frau Mägerlein
 Two Among Millions (1961) - Frau Lohmann
 When Sweet Moonlight Is Sleeping in the Hills (1969) - Frau Miller
 Die Feuerzangenbowle (1970) - Haushälterin von Prof. Crey

Bibliography
 Kosta, Barbara. Willing Seduction: The Blue Angel, Marlene Dietrich, and Mass Culture. Berghahn Books, 2009

External links

1907 births
1976 deaths
German film actresses
German television actresses
German voice actresses
Actresses from Berlin
20th-century German actresses